The BA postcode area, also known as the Bath postcode area, is a group of nineteen postcode districts in South West England, within sixteen post towns. These cover east Somerset (including Bath, Yeovil, Bruton, Castle Cary, Frome, Glastonbury, Radstock, Shepton Mallet, Street, Templecombe, Wells and Wincanton) and west Wiltshire (including Bradford on Avon, Trowbridge, Warminster and Westbury), plus a very small part of north-west Dorset.



Coverage
The approximate coverage of the postcode districts:

|-
! BA1
| BATH
| Bath north of the Avon, Batheaston, Bathford
| Bath and North East Somerset
|-
! BA2
| BATH
| Bath south of the Avon, Farmborough, Timsbury, Peasedown St John, Wellow, Hinton Charterhouse, Norton St Philip, Freshford, Limpley Stoke
| Bath and North East Somerset, Mendip, Wiltshire
|-
! BA3
| RADSTOCK
| Radstock, Midsomer Norton, Holcombe, Coleford
| Bath and North East Somerset, Mendip
|-
! BA4
| SHEPTON MALLET
| Shepton Mallet
| Mendip
|-
! BA5
| WELLS
| Wells
| Mendip
|-
! BA6
| GLASTONBURY
| Glastonbury
| Mendip
|-
! BA7
| CASTLE CARY
| Castle Cary, Ansford, Alford, Lovington
| South Somerset
|-
! BA8
| TEMPLECOMBE
| Templecombe, Henstridge, Horsington
| South Somerset
|-
! style="background:#FFFFFF;"|BA9
| style="background:#FFFFFF;"|BRUTON
| style="background:#FFFFFF;"|
| style="background:#FFFFFF;"|non-geographic
|-
! BA9
| WINCANTON
| Wincanton, Penselwood, Cucklington, Holton, Yarlington
| South Somerset
|-
! BA10
| BRUTON
| Bruton, Pitcombe, Redlynch, Brewham
| South Somerset
|-
! BA11
| FROME
| Frome
| Mendip
|-
! BA12
| WARMINSTER
| Warminster
| Wiltshire
|-
! BA13
| WESTBURY
| Westbury
| Wiltshire
|-
! BA14
| TROWBRIDGE
| Trowbridge
| Wiltshire
|-
! BA15
| BRADFORD-ON-AVON
| Bradford-on-Avon, Winsley, Westwood, Monkton Farleigh, South Wraxall
| Wiltshire
|-
! BA16
| STREET
| Street, Walton
| Mendip
|-
! BA20
| YEOVIL
| Yeovil (centre and south)
| South Somerset
|-
! BA21
| YEOVIL
| Yeovil (north), Mudford
| South Somerset, Dorset
|-
! BA22
| YEOVIL
| Yeovil (west), East Coker, West Coker, Ilchester, Sparkford, Marston Magna, Halstock, Stoford, Clifton Maybank
| South Somerset, Dorset
|}

Map

See also
List of postcode areas in the United Kingdom
Postcode Address File

References

External links
Royal Mail's Postcode Address File
A quick introduction to Royal Mail's Postcode Address File (PAF)

Postcode areas covering South West England